Arman Gabidoullovitch Kamyshev (born 14 March 1991) is a Kazakh road racing cyclist, who last rode for UCI Continental team .

Major results

2008
 1st Stage 4 Tour de l'Abitibi
2010
 1st ZLM Tour
 3rd Overall Vuelta a la Independencia Nacional
 8th Overall Coupe des nations Ville Saguenay
2011
 2nd Overall Coupe des nations Ville Saguenay
1st Stage 3
2012
 1st  Overall Coupe des nations Ville Saguenay
1st Points classification
1st Stages 1 & 3
 1st Stage 2 Tour of Bulgaria
 1st Stage 1 Giro della Valle d'Aosta
 1st Stage 4 Vuelta a la Independencia Nacional
2014
 1st Stage 3 Tour of Hainan
2016
 1st  Road race, National Road Championships
 10th Coppa Bernocchi
2018
 8th Overall Sri Lanka T-Cup

References

External links

 
 

1991 births
Living people
Kazakhstani male cyclists
Sportspeople from Astana
20th-century Kazakhstani people
21st-century Kazakhstani people